Zombie Nation is a 2005 American independent horror film written and directed by Ulli Lommel and starring Brandon Dean, Phil Lander, Karen Maxwell, Naidra Dawn Thomson, and Victoria Ullmann. Despite its title, only six zombies appear in the entire film.

Synopsis
Police officer Joe Singer lives a secret night life in which he kidnaps women, and takes them bound to his warehouse loft, injects them with a mysterious liquid, and then murders them. During his day shift as a cop, Joe is angry and vitriolic on the job. He arrests a woman for jay walking and she ends up in the loft. A psychiatrist visits Joe and keeps repeating, "Is it safe?"

A group of Voodoo priestesses perform a ritual that brings several of Joe's victims back to life as zombies. These girls attack and eat random people before they eventually find Joe.

Reception
Reception of the film has been overwhelmingly negative.

External links
 

2005 films
2005 horror films
2000s police films
American zombie films
American independent films
2000s English-language films
Films directed by Ulli Lommel
Films about Voodoo
Films scored by Robert J. Walsh
2000s American films